The 2010 Valencia Superbike World Championship round was the third round of the 2010 Superbike World Championship season. It took place on the weekend of April 9–11, 2010 at Circuit Ricardo Tormo in Valencia, Spain.

Results

Superbike race 1 classification

Superbike race 2 classification
Race 2 was stopped after 3 laps, because of an accident involving Simon Andrews and Vittorio Iannuzzo. The race was restarted for the remaining 20 laps and the final result was the aggregate of the times of the two heats.

Supersport race classification

External links
 The official website of the Circuit de Valencia
 The official website of the Superbike World Championship

Valencia
Valencia Superbike World Championship round
2010 Superbike World Championship round